The 1903 Arkansas Cardinals football team represented the University of Arkansas during the 1903 college football season. In their first and only season under head coach D. A. McDaniel (an alumnus of the University of Texas), the Razorbacks compiled a 3–4 record and were outscored by their opponents by a combined total of 63 to 50.

Schedule

References

Arkansas
Arkansas Razorbacks football seasons
Arkansas Cardinals football